Matthews is a town in southeastern Mecklenburg County, North Carolina, United States. It is a suburb of Charlotte. The population was 27,198 according to the 2010 Census.

History
In the early 19th century, the new settlement that would become Matthews was unofficially named Stumptown for the copious amount of tree stumps left from making way for cotton farms.  The community's name later changed to Fullwood, named after appointed area postmaster John Miles Fullwood.  The establishment of a sawmill and the cotton and timber industry helped Fullwood change into a town.  Prior to the first train arriving on December 15, 1874, Fullwood acted as a stagecoach stop between Charlotte and Monroe.  The town was incorporated into a municipal corporation in 1879, and was renamed Matthews in honor of Edward Matthews, who was director of the Central Carolina Railroad, which would later become known as the Seaboard Air Line Railroad.

Geography 
Matthews is located at  (35.116851, −80.716409).

Demographics

2020 census

As of the 2020 United States census, there were 29,435 people, 12,011 households, and 8,496 families residing in the town.

2006-2008
As of the 2006-2008 American Community Survey, there were 26,901 people, 11,349 households, and 7,904 families in the town. According to the Census Bureau of 2000, the population density was 1,557.1 people per square mile (601.2/km). There were 138 housing units at an average density of 572.7 per square mile (221.1/km). According to the 2006-2008 American Community Survey, The racial makeup of the town was 82.3% White, 10.1% African American or Black, 0.3% American Indian or Alaska Native, 3.7% Asian, 0.00% Pacific Islander, 1.8% of other race, and 1.7% from two or more races. Hispanic or Latino of any race were 4.3% of the population.

There were 7,904 households, of which 36.1% had children under the age of 18 living with them, 63.4% were married/couples living together, 7.8% had a female householder with no husband present, and 25.5% were non-families. 22.4% of households were one person and 8.2% were one person aged 65 or older. The average household size was 2.61 and the average family size was 3.08.

The age distribution was 29.9% under the age of 19, 3.2% from 20 to 24, 25.6% from 25 to 44, 30.3% from 45 to 64, and 11% 65 or older. The median age was 40.3 years.

The median household income was $77,981 and the median family income  was $88,600. Males had a median income of $65,909 versus $44,665 for females. The per capita income for the town was $35,250. About 2.8% of families and 3.8% of the population were below the poverty line, including 3.6% of those under age 18 and 4.9% of those age 65 or over.

Education 
Matthews is in the Charlotte-Mecklenburg Schools system. Schools in the Matthews city limits include Matthews Elementary, Crown Point Elementary, and Elizabeth Lane Elementary; Crestdale Middle; David W. Butler High School.

Elementary schools serving sections of Matthews include Matthews Elementary, Crown Point, Elizabeth Lane, Mint Hill Elementary in Mint Hill, and Providence Spring (outside of Matthews).

Much of Mathews is zoned to Crestdale Middle School. Portions of Mathews are zoned to Mint Hill Middle in Mint Hill, as well as South Charlotte Middle School. Most of Mathews is zoned to Butler HS, while portions are zoned to Providence High School.

Public charter schools include Matthews Charter Academy, Telra Institute and Socrates Academy. Religious schools nearby include Covenant Day School, Charlotte Christian School, Carmel Christian, Blessed Sacrament Academy, and Greyfriars Classical Academy.

Matthews is served by a branch of the Charlotte Mecklenburg Library. The library is located on the first floor of the Matthews Town Hall and is one of the most active in the system.

Economy 
Companies with headquarters in Matthews include:
 Family Dollar Stores, a store chain.
 Harris Teeter, a grocery store chain.
 Pokertek, a gaming device manufacturer.

Sports
Matthews is home to professional soccer club Stumptown Athletic, named after the suburb's nickname. It was founded in 2019 and plays in US Soccer's third division, the National Independent Soccer Association. Its home stadium is the 5,000 capacity Sportsplex at Matthews.

Notable people 
 Jamar Adams, NFL safety
 Tyler Barnhardt, actor
 J. Curtis Blackwood Jr., Republican member of the North Carolina General Assembly
 Robert Blanton, NFL strong safety
 Jarrett Boykin, wide receiver in both the NFL and CFL
 Cierra Burdick, WNBA player
 Ty Buttrey, MLB pitcher
 Dion Byrum, football cornerback
 Tricia Cotham, Democratic member of the North Carolina House of Representatives
 Brooklyn Decker, model and actress best known for her appearances in the Sports Illustrated Swimsuit Issue
 Jahwan Edwards, football running back
 Ikem Ekwonu, NFL offensive tackle for the Carolina Panthers
 Riley Ferguson, football quarterback
 Jim Gulley, member of the North Carolina General Assembly
 Tomas Hilliard-Arce, professional soccer player
 Darius Kilgo, NFL defensive tackle and two-time Super Bowl champion
 Jordan Lloyd, winner of the reality TV show Big Brother 11 and contestant on Big Brother 13 and The Amazing Race 16
 Jennifer Loven, journalist, former White House press correspondent for the Associated Press (AP)
 Kenneth Moore, NFL wide receiver
 Jerry Reary, NASCAR driver
 Channing Stribling, football cornerback

Sister cities 
Matthews is twinned with:
 Sainte-Maxime, Var, France

References

External links 

 
 Matthews Chamber of Commerce
 Matthews Historical Foundation

Towns in Mecklenburg County, North Carolina
Towns in North Carolina